Satyadev Dubey (13 July 1936 – 25 December 2011) was an Indian theatre director, actor, playwright, screenwriter & film director. He was awarded the Sangeet Natak Akademi Award in 1971.

He won the 1978 National Film Award for Best Screenplay for Shyam Benegal's Bhumika and 1980 Filmfare Best Dialogue Award for Junoon. In 2011, he was honoured with the Padma Bhushan by the Government of India.

Biography
Satyadev Dubey was born in Bilaspur district of the Madhya Pradesh now in Chhattisgarh in 1936. He moved to Mumbai with the aim of becoming a cricketer, but ended up joining the Theatre Unit, a theatre group run by Ebrahim Alkazi, which also ran a school for many budding artists. Later when Alkazi left for Delhi to head the National School of Drama, Dubey took over Theatre Unit, and went on to produce many important plays in the Indian theatre.

He produced Girish Karnad's first play Yayati, and also his noted play Hayavadana, Badal Sarkar's Ewam Indrajit and Pagla Ghoda, Chandrashekhara Kambara's Aur Tota Bola (Jokumaraswamy in original Kannada), Mohan Rakesh's Aadhe Adhure, Vijay Tendulkar's Khamosh! Adalat Jaari Hai, and A Raincoat For All Occasions and Jean Anouilh's Antigone in 2007.

He is credited with the discovery of Dharmavir Bharati's Andha Yug, a play that was written for radio; Dubey saw its potential, sent it across to Ebrahim Alkazi at National School of Drama. When staged in 1962, Andha Yug brought in a new paradigm in Indian theatre of the times.

He made two short films Aparichay ke Vindhachal (1965) and Tongue In Cheek (1968), and directed a Marathi feature film, Shantata! Court Chalu Aahe (1971), based on Vijay Tendulkar's play, which in turn is based on Friedrich Dürrenmatt's story "Die Panne". Dubey had a five decade long and prolific career as theatre actor, director and playwright.

Filmography

Writer
 Shantata! Court Chalu Aahe (1971, director)
 Ankur (1974, dialogue, screenplay)
 Manzilein Aur Bhi Hain (1974, dialogue)
 Nishant (1975, dialogue)
 Bhumika (1977, dialogue, screenplay)
 Junoon (1978, dialogue)
 Kalyug (1980, dialogue)
 Aakrosh (1980, dialogue)
 Vijeta (1982, dialogue, screenplay)
 Mandi (1983, screenplay)

Actor
 Deewaar (1975) - Actor (uncredited)
 Nishant (1975) - Priest (Pujari)
 Kondura (1978) - Ramanayye Master
 Anugraham (1978)
 Godam (1983) - Dharma
 Bharat Ek Khoj (1988, TV Series) - Chanakya
 Pita (1991)
 Maya (1993)
 Aahat Season 1 (1995-2001) (TvSeries)
 Hanan (2004) - Mahapoojary
 Ata Pata Lapatta (2012) - Pagla Baba (final film role)

References

External links
 
 

Indian male screenwriters
Indian theatre directors
Indian male stage actors
Indian male film actors
Marathi film directors
Indian male television actors
Recipients of the Sangeet Natak Akademi Award
Indian male dramatists and playwrights
1936 births
2011 deaths
Recipients of the Padma Bhushan in arts
Hindi theatre
20th-century Indian dramatists and playwrights
Writers from Madhya Pradesh
20th-century Indian male actors
Marathi screenwriters
Screenwriters from Madhya Pradesh
20th-century Indian male writers
Best Original Screenplay National Film Award winners